Paul Kleinert (23 September 1837 – 29 July 1920) was a German theologian, born at Vielguth in Prussian Silesia.

From 1854 to 1857 he studied at the universities of Breslau and Halle. He taught school in Oppeln and Berlin, becoming professor at the University of Berlin in 1868. In 1885-1886 he was rector at the University of Berlin. From 1873 to 1891 he was member (consistorial counsellor) of the Marcher Consistory in Berlin. In 1892 he was promoted upper consistorial counsellor in the Supreme Consistory (Evangelischer Oberkirchenrat; EOK) of the Evangelical State Church of Prussia's older Provinces.

Publications 
Kleinert published: 
 Obadjah-Zephanjah wissenschaftlich und für den Gebrauch der Kirche dargestellt (second edition, 1893)  
 Ueber das Buch Koheleth (Berlin, 1864)  
 Augustin und Goethes Faust (1866)  
 Das Deuteronomium und die Deuteronomiker (1872)  
 Untersuchungen zur alttestamentlichen Rechts- und Litteraturgeschichte (1872)  
 Abriss der Einleitung zum alten Testament in Tabellenform (1878)  
 Abhandlungen zur christlichen Kultus- und Kulturgeschichte (1889)   
 Der preussische Agendenentwurf (1894)  
 Selbstgespräche am Kranken- und Sterbelager (1896)
 Die Propheten Israels in sozialer Beziehung (1905)  
 Homiletek (1907)  
 Musik und Religion (1908)

References 
 Hugo Wilhelm Paul Kleinert Humboldt-Universität zu Berlin (biography)

1837 births
1920 deaths
German Lutheran theologians
People from Oleśnica County
People from the Province of Silesia
University of Breslau alumni
Martin Luther University of Halle-Wittenberg alumni
Academic staff of the Humboldt University of Berlin
19th-century German Protestant theologians
20th-century German Protestant theologians
German male non-fiction writers
19th-century male writers